Shashank Shende is an actor, director, producer and writer in India.

Early life 
Shende grew up in Pune till 10th standard, in a middle-class family. He then moved to Ahmednagar for two years before moving back. After college, he started his own business. He got introduced to acting through Satyadev Dubey's workshops and then went on to form his own experimental theatre troupe, Samanvay, with Sandesh Kulkarni, Nikhil Ratnaparkhi, Amruta Subhash and Sonali Kulkarni. He wanted to be a director.

Career 
Shende has appeared in various Hindi and Marathi language films. He was part of the film Khwada,(meaning an "Obstacle"), which received two awards at the 62nd National Film Awards. The film was also shown at the Pune International Film Festival. He was nominated for the Best Actor Award for Redu at Maharashtra Rajya Chitrapat Mahotsav 2018.

Filmography
Shende was part of films : Ishqiya (as Firoz), City Of Gold, Lalbaug Parel (as Anna), Chillar Party (as Minister Bhide),Chittagong (as Kishorilal), Pangira (as Battasha), Aaghaat (as Dr. Budhkar), Fresh Suicide (as Shivram), Force, Deool, Taryanche Bait, Shala, Bagh Haat Dakhaun (as Krushna) and Maya - The Reality.

References

Year of birth missing (living people)
Living people
Male actors from Pune
Male actors in Hindi cinema
Male actors in Marathi cinema